A bridge management system (BMS) is a means for managing bridges throughout design, construction, operation and maintenance of the bridges. As funds available become tighter, road authorities around the world are facing challenges related to bridge management and the escalating maintenance requirements of large infrastructure assets. Bridge management systems help agencies to meet their objectives, such as building inventories and inspection databases, planning for maintenance, repair and rehabilitation (MR&R) interventions in a systematic way, optimizing the allocation of financial resources, and increasing the safety of bridge users.

The major tasks in bridge management are: collection of inventory data; inspection; assessment of condition and strength; repair, strengthening or replacement of components; and prioritizing the allocation of funds. A BMS is a means of managing bridge information to formulate maintenance programs within cost limitations.  A BMS includes four basic components: data storage, cost and deterioration models, optimization and analysis models, and updating functions. 
&

References

Bridges
Construction
Transportation engineering
Technology systems
Information systems
Management systems